Kitgum District is a district in Northern Uganda. It is named after its major town of Kitgum, where the district headquarters is located. It has suffered many deaths and social disruption resulting from the 20-year civil war within the region during the late 20th century. The government moved tens of thousands of residents  to internally displaced persons camps for their protection, where they were subject to raids by the rebels and also harsh conditions, including disease.

Location
Kitgum District is bordered by South Sudan to the north, Kaabong District to the east, Kotido District to the southeast, Agago District to the south, Pader District to the southwest and Lamwo District to the northwest.

Overview
The district is composed of one county: Chua County. In 2010, Lamwo County was separated from Kitgum District to form Lamwo District. Kitgum District is a constituent part of Acholiland, home to an estimated 1.1 million Acholi, according to the 2002 national census.

Population
In 1991, the Ugandan national population census estimated the district population at about 104,600. According to the national census of 2002, Kitgum District had a population of about 167,000, of whom 51.3% were females and 48.7% were males. The annual population growth rate of the district, between 2002 and 2012, was calculated at 4.1%. It is estimated that the population of the district in 2012, was approximately 247,800.

Economic activities
Agriculture is the main economic activity in the district. Crops grown include the following:

Cattle ranching is practiced in some areas, although not widely.

Hepatitis epidemic
During late 2007 and early 2008, as many of the residents of the Internally Displaced Persons (IDP) camps started to return to their home areas following peace talks, an outbreak of Hepatitis E engulfed the community, and soon spread to the entire district. As of August 2008, a total of 8,157 cases had been identified; 62% were female, while 38% were male. The case fatality ratio was 1.52%. Seventy two percent (72%) of the fatalities were female. The epidemic has been traced to unsanitary sources of drinking water. By July 2009, the number of infected persons had increased to 10,243, of whom 162 died; a case fatality ratio of 1.58%.

Notable people
Matthew Lukwiya, physician
Janani Luwum, martyr. Anglican Archbishop of Uganda killed in 1977 during the conflict; born and buried in Mucwini village.
Sunday Omony, plus-size model born in Kitgum District.
Henry Oryem Okello, politician and lawyer

See also
 Kitgum
 Acholi sub-region
 Acholi people
 Lord's Resistance Army
 Districts of Uganda

References

External links

 American Pastor Kicked Out of Kitgum District

 
Acholi sub-region
Districts of Uganda
Northern Region, Uganda